The 2019 BinckBank Tour was a road cycling stage race that took place between 12 and 18 August 2019 in Belgium and the Netherlands. It was the 15th edition of the BinckBank Tour and the thirty-first event of the 2019 UCI World Tour. It was won by Laurens De Plus.

Teams 

All UCI WorldTeams were invited as the race is part of the UCI World Tour. The race organisation also gave out wildcards to five UCI Professional Continental teams.

UCI WorldTeams

 
 
 
 
 
 
 
 
 
 
 
 
 
 
 
 
 
 

UCI Professional Continental Teams

Schedule 
The race organisation announced the full schedule in June 2019.

Stages

Stage 1
12 August 2019 – Beveren to Hulst,

Stage 2
13 August 2019 – Blankenberge to Ardooie,

Stage 3
14 August 2019 – Aalter to Aalter,

Stage 4
15 August 2019 – Houffalize to Houffalize,

Stage 5
16 August 2019 – Riemst to Venray,

Stage 6
17 August 2019 – The Hague, individual time trial (ITT)

Stage 7
18 August 2019 – Sint-Pieters-Leeuw to Geraardsbergen,

Classification leadership table 

There are four principal classifications in the race. The first of these is the general classification, calculated by adding up the time each rider took to ride each stage. Time bonuses are applied for winning stages (10, 6 and 4 seconds to the first three riders) and for the three "golden kilometre" sprints on each stage. At each of these sprints, the first three riders are given 3-, 2- and 1-second bonuses respectively. The rider with the lowest cumulative time is the winner of the general classification. The rider leading the classification wins a green jersey.

There is also a points classification. On each road stage the riders are awarded points for finishing in the top 10 places, with other points awarded for intermediate sprints. The rider with the most accumulated points is the leader of the classification and wins the red jersey. The combativity classification is based solely on points won at the intermediate sprints; the leading rider wins the white jersey. The final classification is a team classification: on each stage the times of the best three riders on each team are added up. The team with the lowest cumulative time over the seven stages wins the team classification.

Classification standings

General classification

Points classification

Combativity classification

Teams classification

References

2019 UCI World Tour
2019 in Belgian sport
2019 in Dutch sport
2019
August 2019 sports events in Belgium